Moose Lake is a small community in Manitoba, Canada. It is located on the eastern edge of the Saskatchewan River Delta on the western shore of South Moose Lake about 74 km southeast of The Pas. Adjacent to the non-treaty community is a First Nations reserve, home to the Mosakahiken Cree Nation.

History 
The community of Moose Lake Manitoba, with the help of Thomas Henry Peacock Lamb (also known as THP Lamb or Ten Horse-Power Lamb), an Englishman from Yorkshire, built a trading post on the western shore of Moose Lake called Lamb's Store. In 1900, THP build a trading post on the west shore of Moose Lake. The trading post was officially called Lamb's Store but most people referred to it as "The Post" and predated the current community of Moose Lake by several years.

THP's son Tom Lamb (who later started Lamb Air), a Cattle Ranch (7-L), a Muskrat Ranch, commercial fishing and construction bought The Post from his father and operated it for years. Eventually, Tom's son-in-law Jock McAree and daughter Carol (Lamb) bought The Post from Tom Lamb. Jock ran the store for several years with the assistance of his wife and children. Later his son Greg McAree took over, they added a video games room and expanded with a laundromat.  The North West Company eventually bought The Post from Jock and Carol and is operating today.

THP's daughter, Billie Lamb Allan, wrote a memoir of her family's life at Moose Lake at the beginning of the 20th century. The book "Dew Upon the Grass" was published in 1963. The title came from a favorite quotation of her father from the King James version of the bible: "The King's wrath is as the roaring of a lion, but his favour is as dew upon the grass." "Dew Upon the Grass" chronicled the lives of Thomas Henry Peacock Lamb and Caroline Alice Marks Lamb as they raised eleven children in northern Manitoba.

Demographics 

Access 
Moose Lake is accessed from The Pas (which is 103 km by road) by going north on PTH 10, east on Manitoba Provincial Road 287 then south (from Clearwater Lake) on Manitoba Provincial Road 384.

The town has an airport, Moose Lake Airport, known by the IATA code YAD.

References 

Designated places in Manitoba
Hudson's Bay Company trading posts
Localities in Manitoba
Northern communities in Manitoba